Yellow cedar is a common name for several trees and may refer to:

Cupressus nootkatensis, native to northwestern North America

Thuja occidentalis, native to northeastern North America